These are overseas dispatches (Heisei -JSDF deployments outside of Japan) of the Japan Self-Defense Forces (JSDF). Japan sought active international cooperation beyond the framework of previous activities due to the alleviation of tensions after the end of the Cold War in 1989 and the Gulf War that broke out at the beginning of 1991. This began the dispatch of the Self-Defense Forces in the Persian Gulf.

Law 
This is the underlying law that triggered the formation. 2006 (Heisei 18) In accordance with the revised Self-Defense Forces Act (Article 3-2 ), which was enacted on December 15, etc., overseas dispatching was upgraded from an incidental mission to an original mission.

September 1990 - Iran–Iraq War
1991 (Heisei 3) January - Gulf War
December 1991 (Heisei 3) - Dissolution of the Soviet Union.
1992 (Heisei 4) -The United Nations Peace Act (International Peace Cooperation Act / PKO Cooperation Act) was enacted. Law on the dispatch of international emergency relief teams (International Emergency Relief Team) .
1993 (Heisei 5) - North Korea withdrew from the Treaty on the Non-Proliferation of Nuclear Weapons, Rodong-1 quasi-Medium-range ballistic missile test (North Korea nuclear issue).
1994 (Heisei 6) - The revised Self-Defense Forces Act was enacted.
March 1996 (Heisei 8) -Taiwan Strait Crisis due to the inauguration of President Lee Teng-hui in Taiwan, large-scale exercises of the Chinese People's Liberation Army.
June 1998 (Heisei 10) -The revised PKO cooperation law was enacted.
1998 (Heisei 10) - North Korea shoots Taepodong-1 missile.
March 1999 - Suspicious ship incident off Noto Peninsula
May 1999 - Enactment of laws on measures to ensure peace and security in Japan in the event of a circumstance (Neighboring Situation Law) and Defense Guidelines Act (Japan-US New Guideline Law) .
October 2001 (Heisei 13) - War on Terror (War in Afghanistan (2001–present)) begins.
2001 (Heisei 13) -The special measures law against terrorism was enacted.
December 2001 (Heisei 13) - Battle of Amami-Ōshima
2003 (2003) March - Iraq War
July 2003 - Established the Special Measures Act (Iraq Reconstruction Special Measures Act) concerning the implementation of humanitarian recovery support activities and safety support activities in Iraq .
July 2006 (Heisei 18) - North Korea, Taepodong-2 and other 7 missile launch experiments.
2006 (2006) 10 May - North Korea, again conducted a nuclear test.
2006 (2006) 12 May - the Japanese Defense Agency was promoted to the Ministry of Defense (Japan), to the original mission overseas dispatch amendment with the Ministry of Defense Establishment Law, Self-Defense Forces Law established.
2007 (2007) January - Defense Agency becomes the Ministry of Defense.
2007 (2007) 11 May - Anti-Terrorism Special Measures Law is revoked.
January 16, 2008 - The Special Measures Law (New Terrorism Special Measures Law) concerning the implementation of supply support activities for anti-terrorism maritime prevention activities was enacted, and supply activities were resumed.
June 19, 2009 (Heisei 21) - The law on the punishment of piracy and the coping with piracy (the Piracy Action Law) was enacted.
2009 (2009) July - Iraq Special Measures Law is revoked.
January 16, 2010 (Heisei 22) - New Terrorism Special Measures Law expires.
2013 (January 2013) - In Amenas hostage crisis
November 15, 2013 - The revised Self-Defense Forces Act was enacted.
September 30, 2015 - Enactment of a law (International Peace Support Act) on cooperation support activities for foreign armies, etc. implemented by Japan for the joint international peace coping project . The revised PKO cooperation law was enacted. The revised Peripheral Situation Law (Important Impact Situation Law) was enacted. The revised Self-Defense Force Law was enacted. (2015 Japanese military legislation)

JSDF Overseas Dispatches 

Since 1991, the Japan Self-Defense Forces have conducted international activities to provide support for peacekeeping missions and disaster relief efforts as well as to help prevent conflict and terrorism.

References

Japan Self-Defense Forces